Virgilio Oñate Gil (18 December 1924 – 1 June 1987) was a Spanish politician who served as Minister of Agriculture of Spain between 1975 and 1976, during the Francoist dictatorship.

References

1924 births
1987 deaths
Agriculture ministers of Spain
Government ministers during the Francoist dictatorship